Mornico al Serio is a comune (municipality) in the Province of Bergamo in the Italian region of Lombardy, located about  northeast of Milan and about  southeast of Bergamo.

Mornico al Serio borders the following municipalities: Calcinate, Ghisalba, Martinengo, Palosco.

Demographic evolution

References